Héctor Hugo Fértoli (born 3 December 1994) is an Argentine professional footballer who plays as a left winger for Racing Club.

Career
Fértoli first appeared in the first-team of Argentine Primera División side Newell's Old Boys during the 2013–14 campaign, he was an unused substitute for a 3–2 defeat to Arsenal de Sarandí on 4 May 2014. He made his professional debut in February 2016 against Rosario Central, before scoring his first goal two appearances later in a 1–0 win over Huracán. In his first two seasons, Fértoli made twenty-two appearances and scored five goals for Newell's Old Boys. In January 2019, Fértoli completed a move to San Lorenzo for $1.6m; signing until June 2020.

Career statistics
.

References

External links

1994 births
Living people
People from San Martín Department, Santa Fe
Argentine people of Italian descent
Argentine footballers
Association football wingers
Argentine Primera División players
Newell's Old Boys footballers
San Lorenzo de Almagro footballers
Racing Club de Avellaneda footballers
Talleres de Córdoba footballers
Sportspeople from Santa Fe Province